Lesser Khingan (Maly Khingan) is a mountain range in China's Heilongjiang province and the adjacent parts of Russia's Amur Oblast and Jewish Autonomous Oblast. 

In Russia, the range is part of the Khingan Nature Reserve.

Geography
In China, the Khingan mountains are divided into the Greater Khingan and Lesser Khingan. The Lesser Khingan range runs roughly from the northwest to the southeast and separates the valley of the Amur (Heilongjiang) River from that of the Nenjiang River. The mountain range then turns toward the east and north-east, entering Russia. The Amur/Heilongjiang, which is a border river, forms a gorge when crossing the mountain range.

See also
Khingan Nature Reserve
Greater Khingan
Xing'an

References

External links

Mountain ranges of Russia
Landforms of Heilongjiang
Mountain ranges of Amur Oblast
Landforms of the Jewish Autonomous Oblast